"Étude" is a single by musician Mike Oldfield, released in 1984. It is from the album The Killing Fields, the soundtrack album for the film of the same name .  It was reissued in 1990, when it was used in a commercial for Nurofen.  The 1990 release also featured a track called "Gakkaen" by The Ono Gagaku Kai Society.

"Étude" is taken from the Francisco Tárrega piece "Recuerdos de la Alhambra".

Music video 
The music video for "Étude" which appears on the Elements – The Best of Mike Oldfield video shows a boy watching parts of The Killing Fields on a television from a reel-to-reel tape machine and looking through photographs. The boy also plays with a Fairlight CMI, which the soundtrack album was composed on.

Track listing

7-inch vinyl 
 "Étude" (edit) – 3:07
 "Evacuation" (edit) – 4:11

12-inch vinyl 
 "Étude" – 4:38
 "Evacuation" – 5:13

1990 release 
 "Étude" – Mike Oldfield
 "Gakkaen" – The Ono Gagaku Kai Society

References 
 

1984 singles
1990 singles
Mike Oldfield songs
Virgin Records singles
1984 songs